Justice Knudson may refer to:

 Emery T. Knudson, associate justice of the Idaho Supreme Court
 Harvey B. Knudson, associate justice of the North Dakota Supreme Court
 Oscar Knutson, associate justice and chief justice of the Minnesota Supreme Court